The 2016 South American Rhythmic Gymnastics Championships were held in Paipa, Colombia, October 6–9, 2016. The competition was organized by the Colombian Gymnastics Federation and approved by the International Gymnastics Federation.

Medal summary

Senior medalists

Medal table
Senior events

References 

2016 in gymnastics
Rhythmic Gymnastics,2016
International gymnastics competitions hosted by Colombia
2016 in Colombian sport